HQL may refer to:

Hibernate Query Language, a language for writing queries against Hibernate data objects
Tashkurgan Khunjerab Airport (IATA: HQL), Kashgar, Xinjiang, China
H & Q Life Sciences Investors, a company listed on the New York Stock Exchange
Handgun Qualification License, under the gun laws in Maryland, United States

See also
Jakarta Persistence Query Language, an object-oriented query language similar to the Hibernate Query Language